Schloss Michelfeld is a manor house situated in Michelfeld, Baden-Württemberg, Germany.

Origins
The manor has, throughout the years, served as a private home to various nobles, including the Counts of Katzellenbogen and the Lords of Gemmingen. The manor's first documented mention is in the year 1390. The manor as it is today was built in 1753 by the Lords of Gemmingen-Hornberg, probably on the ruin of a castle that was destroyed during the Thirty Years' War.

Schloss Rheydt today
The manor was is still privately owned. The rest of the estate buildings have been converted into a Restaurant and hotel.
Since then the manor has undergone both interior and exterior restoration twice in recent years due to the manor partially burning down twice.

References

External links
 Sights of Angelbachtal (German)
 Schloss Michelfeld website (German)

Landmarks in Germany